Cannabis sativa is an annual herbaceous flowering plant indigenous to Eastern Asia, but now of cosmopolitan distribution due to widespread cultivation. It has been cultivated throughout recorded history, used as a source of industrial fiber, seed oil, food, recreation, religious and spiritual moods and medicine. Each part of the plant is harvested differently, depending on the purpose of its use. The species was first classified by Carl Linnaeus in 1753. The word sativa means "things that are cultivated."

Plant physiology

The flowers of Cannabis sativa are unisexual and plants are most often either male or female. It is a short-day flowering plant, with staminate (male) plants usually taller and less robust than pistillate (female or male) plants. The flowers of the female plant are arranged in racemes and can produce hundreds of seeds. Male plants shed their pollen and die several weeks prior to seed ripening on the female plants. Under typical conditions with a light period of 12 to 14 hours, both sexes are produced in equal numbers because of heritable X and Y chromosomes. Although genetic factors dispose a plant to become male or female, environmental factors including the diurnal light cycle can alter sexual expression.  Naturally occurring monoecious plants, with both male and female parts, are either sterile or fertile; but artificially induced "hermaphrodites" can have fully functional reproductive organs. "Feminized" seed sold by many commercial seed suppliers are derived from artificially "hermaphroditic" females that lack the male gene, or by treating the plants with hormones or silver thiosulfate.

Pharmacology

Although the main psychoactive constituent of Cannabis is tetrahydrocannabinol (THC), the plant is known to contain more than 500 compounds, among them at least 113 cannabinoids; however, most of these "minor" cannabinoids are only produced in trace amounts. Besides THC, another cannabinoid produced in high concentrations by some plants is cannabidiol (CBD), which is not psychoactive but has recently been shown to block the effect of THC in the nervous system. Differences in the chemical composition of Cannabis varieties may produce different effects in humans. Synthetic THC, called dronabinol, does not contain cannabidiol (CBD), cannabinol (CBN), or other cannabinoids, which is one reason why its pharmacological effects may differ significantly from those of natural Cannabis preparations.

Chemical constituents
Beside cannabinoids, the chemical constituents of Cannabis include about 120 compounds responsible for its characteristic aroma. These are mainly volatile terpenes and sesquiterpenes.
 α-Pinene
 Myrcene
 Linalool
 Limonene
 Trans-β-ocimene
 α-Terpinolene
 Trans-caryophyllene
 α-Humulene, contributes to the characteristic aroma of Cannabis sativa
 Caryophyllene, with which some hashish detection dogs are trained

Cannabis also produces numerous volatile sulfur compounds that contribute to the plant's skunk-like aroma, with Prenylthiol (3-methyl-2-butene-1-thiol) identified as the primary odorant. These compounds are found in much lower concentrations than the major terpenes and sesquiterpenes. However, they contribute significantly to the pungent aroma of cannabis due to their low odor thresholds as often seen with thiols or other sulfur-containing compounds.

Common uses

Cannabis sativa seeds are chiefly used to make hempseed oil which can be used for cooking, lamps, lacquers, or paints. They can also be used as caged-bird feed, as they provide a source of nutrients for most animals. The flowers and fruits (and to a lesser extent the leaves, stems, and seeds) contain psychoactive chemical compounds known as cannabinoids that are consumed for recreational, medicinal, and spiritual purposes. When so used, preparations of flowers and fruits (called marijuana) and leaves and preparations derived from resinous extract (e.g., hashish) are consumed by smoking, vaporising, and oral ingestion. Historically, tinctures, teas, and ointments have also been common preparations. In traditional medicine of India in particular cannabis sativa has been used as hallucinogenic, hypnotic, sedative, analgesic, and anti-inflammatory agent. Terpenes have gained public awareness through the growth and education of medical and recreational cannabis. Organizations and companies operating in cannabis markets have pushed education and marketing of terpenes in their products as a way to differentiate taste and effects of cannabis. The entourage effect, which describes the synergy of cannabinoids, terpenes, and other plant compounds, has also helped further awareness and demand for terpenes in cannabis products.

Cultivation
A Cannabis plant in the vegetative growth phase of its life requires more than 16–18 hours of light per day to stay vegetative. Flowering usually occurs when darkness equals at least 12 hours per day. The flowering cycle can last anywhere between seven and fifteen weeks, depending on the strain and environmental conditions. When the production of psychoactive cannabinoids is sought, female plants are grown separately from male plants to induce parthenocarpy in the female plant's fruits (popularly called "sin semilla" which is Spanish for "without seed" ) and increase the production of cannabinoid-rich resin.

In soil, the optimum pH for the plant is 6.3 to 6.8. In hydroponic growing, the nutrient solution is best at 5.2 to 5.8, making Cannabis well-suited to hydroponics because this pH range is hostile to most bacteria and fungi.

Tissue culture multiplication has become important in producing medically important clones, while seed production remains the generally preferred means of multiplication. Sativa plants have narrow leaves and grow best in warm environments. They do, however, take longer to flower than their Indica counterparts, and they grow taller than the Indica cannabis strains as well.

Cultivars
Broadly, there are three main cultivar groups of cannabis that are cultivated today:
 Cultivars primarily cultivated for their fibre, characterized by long stems and little branching.
 Cultivars grown for seed which can be eaten entirely raw or from which hemp oil is extracted.
 Cultivars grown for medicinal or recreational purposes, characterized by extensive branching to maximize the number of flowers.
A nominal if not legal distinction is often made between industrial hemp, with concentrations of psychoactive compounds far too low to be useful for that purpose, and marijuana.

See also 

 Cannabis indica
 Cannabis ruderalis
 Cannabis strains
 Difference between C. indica and C. sativa

References

External links 

 

Cannabis strains
Crops originating from Asia
Entheogens
Euphoriants
Flora of Central Asia
Hemp
Medicinal plants of Asia
Phytoremediation plants
Plants described in 1753
Plants used in traditional Chinese medicine
Taxa named by Carl Linnaeus